Peltaspermaceae is a natural family of seed ferns (Pteridospermatophyta) widespread in both northern and southern hemispheres coal measures of Permian and Triassic age. Peltasperms persisted in a relictual distribution in Patagonia during the Early Jurassic.

Description 
Peltaspermaceae have umbrella-like (peltate) cupules with numerous pendant ovules born in complex large branching structures (Peltaspermum).
The pollen organ (Antevsia) has radiating cigar-shaped pollen sacs attached to small blades, again in complex branching structures. 
The leaves (Lepidopteris) are bipinnate to tripinnate with small pinnules on the rachis.

References

External links 

Permian plants
Triassic plants
Prehistoric plant families
Pteridospermatophyta
Permian first appearances
Triassic extinctions